HD 189080, also known as HR 7621 or rarely 74 G. Telescopii, is a solitary orange-hued star located in the southern constellation Telescopium. It has an apparent magnitude of 6.18, placing it near the limit for naked eye visibility. At its current distance, HD 189080's brightness is diminished by 0.17 magnitudes due to extinction from interstellar dust. It has an  absolute magnitude of +1.1.

This is an evolved red giant with a stellar classification of K0 III. It is currently on the  red giant branch, fusing a hydrogen shell around an inert helium core. It has 119% the mass of the Sun, but at the age of 4.83 billion years it has expanded to 9.9 times the radius of the Sun. HD 189080 is slightly metal deficient with [Fe/H] = −0.11 and spins too slowly to be measured accurately.

References

K-type giants
Telescopium (constellation)
Telescopii, 74
CD-49 12949
189080
098482
7621